The 1942 edition of the Campeonato Carioca kicked off on April 5, 1942 and ended on October 11. The final standings were delayed 140 days, as Botafogo challenged the result of their loss to São Cristóvão in court, ultimately losing. Flamengo won the tournament for their 8th time. Botafogo finished runners-up.

Format
The tournament was disputed in a triple round-robin format, with the team with the most points winning the title. No teams were relegated.

Final standings

Top Scores

References

Campeonato Carioca seasons
Carioca